The Antonov An-178 is a short-range medium-airlift military transport aircraft designed by the Ukrainian Antonov company and based on the Antonov An-158 (An-148-200). It was announced on 5 February 2010, rolled out on 16 April 2015 and the maiden flight was on 7 May 2015.

The An-178 is proposed to replace outdated aircraft like the An-12, An-26 and An-32. The aircraft will have an avionics suite similar to the An-148, and will use Progress D-436-148FM engines.

The An-178 is a potential competitor for the Embraer KC-390 from Brazil. The company plans to build more than 200 of the aircraft.

Design and development

An-178 is a high-wing transport aircraft with moderately swept wing, winglets and a T-tail. The airframe is made of aluminium alloys and composite materials. The fuselage is semi-monocoque with a circular cross-section. The retractable landing gear consists of two main wheel bogies and a dual nose wheel. The flight control system is dual duplex fly-by-wire system, consisting of two parts:  FCS-A and FCS-B, each of which is responsible for two control channels. The flight control surfaces include ailerons near the wing tips, four control spoilers, six lift-dump/speed-brake spoilers, rudder and elevators, with an emergency mechanical cable back-up system. The powerplant consists of two Progress D-436-148FM turbofan engines, mounted on pylons under the wings and an auxiliary power unit. It can shift 18 tonnes over 1,000 km, or 10 tonnes over 4,000 km.

The aircraft was derived from the 99-seat An-158 regional airliner and was fitted with the commonized F1 fuselage nose section  with the identical flight deck, wing panels, empennage and most of the onboard systems. The fuselage however was newly created with an enlarged diameter that had grown from 3.35 m to 3.9 m, which has resulted in an enlarged cargo hold - the cargo cabin cross section increased to 2.75 m by 2.75 m. Aside from the wing structure, outer panels (including winglets), front fuselage nose, cockpit and nose landing gear which come from the An-158, there is an extra pair of tandem main-wheels on each side. The aircraft made its Western debut at the 2015 Paris Air Show.

There are reports that future production-standard aircraft will have a longer wingspan while retaining the organic wing panels of the An-158. Its maximal takeoff weight would increase to an estimated 56 tons. Later production variants would need turbofan engines with a thrust of about 9,500 kgf to have the characteristics required. The planned engine may be the new-generation in-development Ivchenko-Progress AI-28 turbofan. The decision was made to fit the An-178 prototype with less powerful D-436-148FM engines in the interim. The D-436-148FM is a derivative of the production-standard D-436-148 with an upgraded fan, which boosted the takeoff thrust to 7,800 kgf and at emergency power rating to 8,580 kgf.

Operators

Orders and letters of intent
 
 Maximus Air - Letter of intent
 
 Silk Way Airlines - launch customer with a firm order for 10 aircraft placed in May 2015.
 
 Royal Saudi Air Force - Letter of intent for 30 aircraft, though the planned order was later reported to have been cancelled.
 
 Iraqi Army - 2 on order
 
 A-Star - China Beijing technology company placed order for 50 aircraft and proposed to establish joint production in PRC.
 
 Ministry of Internal Affairs of Ukraine - ordered 13 aircraft 
 Ukrainian Air Force - ordered 3 aircraft (AN-178-100P) (The assembly of the first one has started in spring 2021)

 Ministry of the Interior of Peru - ordered 1 aircraft, which was cancelled.

Specifications

See also

References

External links

An-178
2010s Ukrainian cargo aircraft
Ukrainian military transport aircraft
Twinjets
T-tail aircraft
High-wing aircraft
Aircraft first flown in 2015